Ludwig Friedrich Sorhagen (18 August 1836, in Mühlhausen – 14 July 1914, in Hamburg) was a German entomologist who specialised in Microlepidoptera.
His training at the University of Halle began in 1858 and included classical philology and German studies, but also geography and natural sciences. He became a teacher. 
Sorhagen was a Burschenschaft liberal. He is honoured in the genus name Sorhagenia

Works
Sorhagen, L F., 1922. Beiträge zur Biologie Europäischer Nepticula Arten. Arch. Naturgesch.

Collections
His collection of Palearctic moths and leafminers is held by the Zoologisches Museum, Hamburg.

References
Reh, L. 1922: Ludwig Friedrich Sorhagen. Ein Nachruf. Archiv für Naturgeschichte. Abt. A, Berlin 28 (3), S. 2-9, pp. 2–9, Portr. + Schriftvz pdf

1914 deaths
1836 births
German lepidopterists